The 1998 Wakefield Metropolitan District Council election took place on 7 May 1998 to elect members of Wakefield Metropolitan District Council in West Yorkshire, England. One-third of the council was up for election and the Labour party kept overall control of the council.

After the election, the composition of the council was
Labour 59
Conservative 2
Independent 1
Vacant 1

Election result

References

1998 English local elections
1998
1990s in West Yorkshire